Robert Nebřenský (born 8 February 1964) is a Czech actor, musician, comedian, songwriter, and composer.

In years 1986–2002 and since 2010 to this day, Nebřenský has been active in Czech rock music band Vltava.
 
 
In the beginnings of his career, he collaborated with popular Czech theatre Sklep.
He is currently playing in films (such as Tobruk), and writing songs for other musicians.

Filmography 
	1991	–	Penziónek (TV film)
	1994	–	Historky od krbu (TV serial), Mlýny (TV film)
	1998	–	Multicar Movie Show
	2003	–	Mazaný Filip
	2004	–	Nadměrné maličkosti: Nehoda (TV film), Na stojáka (TV show)
	2005	–       Bazén (TV serial)
	2006	–	Letiště (TV serial), Prachy dělaj člověka, Rádio Kebrle, Ro(c)k podvraťáků
	2007	–	La Vie en rose, Dame d'Izieu, La (TV serial), Gynekologie 2 (TV serial), O život, Princezna z Kloboukových hor (TV serial), Trapasy (TV serial)
	2008	–	Tobruk, The Red Baron, Hvězdný reportér (TV show)
	2009	–	Vyprávěj (TV serial), Alles Gute (TV show)

Documents 
 1991 – Míč (TV film)

References

External links

1964 births
Czech male film actors
Czech male stage actors
Czech musicians
Czech guitarists
Male guitarists
20th-century Czech male singers
Czech songwriters
Czech male composers
Czech comedians
Living people
Male actors from Prague
21st-century Czech male singers